The 2010 UCI Track Cycling World Championships were the World Championships for track cycling in 2010. They took place at the Ballerup Super Arena in Ballerup, Denmark from 24 to 28 March 2010.

Participating nations
38 nations participated

  (3)
  (20)
  (5)
  (1)
  (7)
  (2)
  (9)
  (2)
  (16)
  (1)
  (3)
  (9)
  (13)
  (14)
  (21)
  (19)
  (22)
  (13)
  (8)
  (1)
  (5)
  (15)
  (5)
  (1)
  (1)
  (7)
  (2)
  (3)
  (15)
  (17)
  (14)
  (1)
  (21)
  (9)
  (1)
  (3)
  (16)
  (8)

Medal summary

Medal table

See also

 2009–10 UCI Track Cycling World Ranking
 2009–10 UCI Track Cycling World Cup Classics

References

External links
Results book
Official event website

 
UCI Track Cycling World Championships
UCI Track Cycling World Championships
UCI Track Cycling World Championships by year
International cycle races hosted by Denmark
March 2010 sports events in Europe